Long Seridan Airport  is an airport serving Long Seridan in the state of Sarawak in Malaysia.

Airlines and destinations

See also

References

External links
Short Take-Off and Landing Airports (STOL) at Malaysia Airports Holdings Berhad

Airports in Sarawak